Saleh Al-Nashmi (born 26 December 1995) is a Saudi Arabian professional footballer who plays as a right back for Al-Sahel.

Career
Al-Nashmi started his career at the youth team of Al-Fateh and represented the club at every level. On 31 August 2018, Al-Nashmi joined Al-Thoqbah. On 18 September 2020, Al-Nashmi returned to Al-Fateh on a three-year deal. On 25 July 2022, Al-Nashmi was released from his contract by Al-Fateh. Following his release from Al-Fateh, Al-Nashmi joined First Division side Al-Sahel on 5 August 2022.

References

External links
 

1995 births
Living people
People from Al-Hasa
Saudi Arabian footballers
Association football fullbacks
Al-Fateh SC players
Al-Thoqbah Club players
Al-Sahel SC (Saudi Arabia) players
Saudi Second Division players
Saudi First Division League players
Saudi Professional League players